Alexander Ilyich Dutov (Kazalinsk, Russian Empire – 7 February 1921, Shuiding, China) was one of the leaders of the Cossack counterrevolution in the Urals, lieutenant general (1919).

Dutov was born in Kazalinsk in Syr-Darya Oblast (now Kazaly in Kazakhstan). He was assistant commander of the Cossack regiment during World War I. After the February Revolution, Dutov was appointed head of the All-Russian Cossack Army Union, then chairman of the counterrevolutionary All-Russian Cossack Congress (June, 1917), and then Chief of the Army Administration and ataman of the Orenburg Cossack Army (September).

In November 1917, Dutov raised a revolt against the Soviet authorities in Orenburg. In June 1918, Dutov, with the help of the Czech Legion, organized a struggle for complete termination of the Soviet authority in the Urals. He was in charge of the Orenburg Independent Army in Aleksandr Kolchak's army.

In 1919, he tried to convince General Grigory Semyonov to join him as a stronger force to fight the Red Army. Semyonov refused despite a significant diplomatic effort from Governor Vasile Balabanov claiming he was governor only since the provisional government in Saint Petersburg collapsed in the revolution.

After his army's defeat by Red Army, Dutov led his Orenburg Army in the Starving March during winter of 1919–1920 to Semirechye, and from there in March–May 1920 to China. At that time, General Dutov also helped a number of Russian leaders, including Vasile Balabanov, the administrator of Semirechye, to escape to China.

Dutov was assassinated in Suiding, China, by the Bolshevik agent Мahmud Khadzhamirov (Махмуд Хаджамиров) in February 1921.

See also
Russian Civil War
White Movement

References

1879 births
1921 deaths
Orenburg Cossacks
People from Kyzylorda Region
People from Syr-Darya Oblast
Assassinated military personnel
Military Engineering-Technical University alumni
Cossacks from the Russian Empire
Anti-communists from the Russian Empire
Russian military personnel of World War I
People of the Russian Civil War
Imperial Russian Army generals
Russian Constituent Assembly members
White movement generals
White Russian emigrants to China
Assassinated Russian people
People murdered in China
Recipients of the Order of Saint Stanislaus (Russian)
People killed in Soviet intelligence operations